Aurel Bylykbashi is a member of the Assembly of the Republic of Albania for the Democratic Party of Albania. He joined the assembly after the resignation of 3 members at the 2011 Albanian local elections.

Footnotes

Living people
Democratic Party of Albania politicians
Members of the Parliament of Albania
21st-century Albanian politicians
Year of birth missing (living people)